Soheil Ayari (born 5 April 1970) is a French-Iranian race car driver born in Aix-les-Bains, Savoie, from an Iranian father and a French mother. He won the French Formula Ford championship of 1994, Formula Three championship of 1996 and the Macau Grand Prix of 1997. From 1997 until 2000, he competed in Formula 3000 where he won two races before moving on to the French Supertouring Championship in 2001 where he became champion in 2002, 2004 and 2005.

In 2006 and 2007, he drove in GT Championship, in GT1 for Team Oreca (on a Saleen S7-R). He became French champion in 2006 & 2007 and won the European Le Mans séries championship in 2007 with Stephane Ortelli.
In 2008 & 2009, he drove a Corvette GT 1 in French GT 3 championship before joining the Audi ORECA Team in 2010.
In 2011, he raced and won 2 Championships : ILMC LMP2 (Signatech Nissan) and International Open GT with JMB Ferrari F458 GT2

Soheil Ayari is also a famous 24 Hours of Le Mans driver with 11 starts in GT 1, LMP1 & LMP2. Best results over all were 4th in 2004 ((Pescarolo)) & 2010 (ORECA 01)), 5th in 2009 ((ORECA)) and 2nd LMP2 (Signatech Nissan) in 2011.

In 2014, he was in the European Le Mans Series, and in 2015, was in the French GT Championship in which he remained in 2016. In 2017, he switched to the GT4 European Southern Cup and in 2018, moved into French GT's again. Ayari also works as a journalist specialising in track tests and races in historic events.

Racing record

Complete International Formula 3000 results
(key) (Races in bold indicate pole position) (Races in italics indicate fastest lap)

24 Hours of Le Mans results

Complete World Touring Car Championship results
(key) (Races in bold indicate pole position) (Races in italics indicate fastest lap)

FIA GT Series results

References

External links
 http://www.ayari.com/
 Profile on Historic Racing

1970 births
Living people
People from Aix-les-Bains
French Formula Three Championship drivers
French racing drivers
Indy Lights drivers
French people of Iranian descent
World Touring Car Championship drivers
24 Hours of Le Mans drivers
International Formula 3000 drivers
Auto GP drivers
European Le Mans Series drivers
American Le Mans Series drivers
FIA World Endurance Championship drivers
International GT Open drivers
Sportspeople from Savoie
Iranian expatriate sportspeople in France
Oreca drivers
Team Astromega drivers
Durango drivers
Scuderia Coloni drivers
Signature Team drivers
Peugeot Sport drivers
Pescarolo Sport drivers
Graff Racing drivers
AF Corse drivers
Le Mans Cup drivers
GT4 European Series drivers